Greatest Hits... So Far!!! is the first greatest hits album by American singer-songwriter Pink. It was released on November 12, 2010 by Jive Records, in celebration of Pink's first decade on the music scene. The album features Pink's biggest hits from all her studio albums. Its track list differs depending on region, with four new tracks, only two of which are included in the North American edition.

The hit singles "Raise Your Glass" and "Fuckin' Perfect" peaked at number one and number two on the Hot 100 chart, respectively. In addition, "Heartbreak Down" achieved airplay success in some countries. This was the last material that Pink released under LaFace Records and is also her only album released under Jive Records before both labels were folded into RCA Records in late 2011. The compilation debuted at number 14 on the US Billboard 200 chart and advanced to number five during the holiday season due to the success of its singles, which raised Pink's total number of top-ten hits to eleven, and that of her number-one singles to three. The compilation's artwork was highly praised and its deluxe edition won the O Music Award for Best iTunes LP.

Background
In September 2010, MTV Brazil stated that Pink would be releasing a greatest hits album in the fourth quarter of 2010. A few days later, it was reported by director Cole Walliser, who earlier worked with Pink on her Funhouse Carnival Tour advert, that he was shooting a new video with Pink. On September 15, Pink was spotted at a photoshoot in LA, and according to the photographer, the shoot was for her greatest hits compilation. The album is available in both standard and deluxe editions, with a British release date set for November 15, and a US release set for the day after. On October 5, the album was officially announced, along with its cover artwork.

Originally, Pink was against releasing a greatest hits compilation, stating that she "was not inspired at all for this album... I always figured you need to be 60 or better, to have a little more past, to put one of these out. I fought it for years." However, she changed her mind, realizing that "record companies can put out compilations without your permission" and concluded: "I wanted it done my way, so I jumped on board. Then, the less skeptical I felt about it, I started to feel a little proud."

Singles

"Raise Your Glass" was released as the album's lead single in the first week of October. It was announced by Pink via her Twitter account and went on to top the charts in the United States and Australia. According to Pink, the song is dedicated to those who "felt they were not a part of the popular crowd". Its accompanying music video was directed by Dave Meyers, and celebrates gay marriage, animal rights and, as Pink puts it, "underdogs".

"Fuckin' Perfect" was released as the second single from the album. The song entered several charts before its official release as a single and has so far reached number ten in Australia and number two in the United States. In the United Kingdom, the song was released in February. It entered the UK singles chart at number 71 with the release of its host album and ultimately reached the top ten. The song's music video was filmed during an early stage of Pink's pregnancy, and features actress Tina Majorino, who plays the role of a troubled girl who ultimately becomes a famous artist. The song peaked at number 1.

"Heartbreak Down" was released as an airplay and promotional single only in central and eastern European countries in June 2011. The song peaked at number two on the Hungarian Airplay chart.

Track listing

Deluxe edition bonus DVD

Charts

Weekly charts

Year-end charts

Decade-end charts

Certifications and sales

Release history

References

2010 greatest hits albums
Albums produced by Shellback (record producer)
Albums produced by Max Martin
Jive Records compilation albums
Pink (singer) albums